The 2017 JLT Community Series was the Australian Football League (AFL) pre-season competition played before the 2017 home and away season. It featured 27 matches across 25 days, which began on 16 February 2017 and ended on 12 March 2017. For the fourth year in a row, the competition did not have a Grand Final or overall winner. The competition had a new sponsor in 2017 in Jardine Lloyd Thompson (JLT), who replaced National Australia Bank (NAB) after NAB elected to sponsor the inaugural AFL Women's season instead. All matches were televised live on Fox Footy as well as on the AFL Live app.

Results

References

JLT Community Series
Australian Football League pre-season competition